Blair Athol is located about  north of the Adelaide CBD, South Australia. Blair Athol borders the suburbs of Gepps Cross, Enfield, Prospect and Kilburn. The suburb is rectangular, stretching from Grand Junction Road in the north to Angwin Avenue in the south between Prospect Road on the west and Main North Road on the east. Blair Athol's main and longest street is Florence Avenue.

History
Blair Athol was originally a private subdivision of section 357 in the Hundred of Yatala in the vicinity of today's Lionel Avenue. The suburb name was formalised in 1944 at which time the boundaries stretched from Grand Junction Road to Irish Harp Road (now Regency Road). In 2000, the portion south of Angwin Avenue and its easterly projection to Main North Road was annexed by Prospect.

The historic area known as Gepp's Cross (named for the busy intersection of Main North Road and Grand Junction Road) overlaps the north east corner of the modern suburb and includes the historic Gepps Cross Hotel (also known as Gepp's Cross Inn). The modern suburb of Gepps Cross occupies only the land north of the intersection.

Blair Athol Post Office opened on 15 June 1955 and was renamed Blair Athol West in 1966. At that time the existing Enfield office (open since 1852) was renamed Blair Athol and it was replaced by the Enfield Plaza office in 1997.

Reserves
Blair Athol has several reserves: Blair Athol Recreational Reserve, Barton Street Reserve, Dingley Dell Reserve, Anson Street Reserve and Dover Street Reserve. It features a football oval, a cricket ground with batting cages, two netball/basketball courts, and tennis courts which are exclusively used by members of the Kilburn tennis club. The reserve also has two playgrounds, a gazebo, the Kilburn Football & Cricket Club, and a large parking lot. Barton Street Reserve features a large grass field and a playground with several benches.

Government
Blair Athol is run by the City of Port Adelaide Enfield. The council was set up in 1996 and one of its main offices is located in Enfield. The South Australian Education Department helped set up the school system in Blair Athol and Kilburn.
Blair Athol has three main schools. Gepps Cross Primary School and St. Paul Lutheran Primary School cater for levels 1–7. Gepps Cross Senior School is the only secondary school in Blair Athol and is partners with Enfield High School.

Shopping
Blair Athol has one of the few family-owned hardware stores left, Randall's Hardware, next to another family-owned business Pets Everywhere. There was formerly a Coles Supermarkets located on the corner of Florence Avenue and Prospect Road. This supermarket ceased operation in July 2016, with the site to be redeveloped. It was reopened in 2017 as an IGA featuring products from Afghanistan, Iran and Pakistan. Kilburn Post Office is located across the road from it.

Transport
Blair Athol is serviced by the G10 bus line between Adelaide and Grand Junction Road, travelling via Prospect Road and also bus routes 221, 222, 224, 225, 226, 228 and 229, G10, G10A, G10B which travel between Adelaide and various destinations in the Northern suburbs via Main North Road.   Residents of Blair Athol can also catch the train line to and from the city. The station is located in Kilburn, several hundred metres from Prospect Road.

See also
 List of Adelaide suburbs

References

External links
City of Port Adelaide Enfield

Suburbs of Adelaide